Sophea is a surname. Notable people with the surname include:

Meas Sophea (born 1955), Cambodian general
Pich Sophea (born 1985), Cambodian singer
Thun Sophea (born 1979), Cambodian kickboxer

See also
Sophia (given name) 

Surnames of Asian origin